The 2006 Austrian Figure Skating Championships took place between 16 and 18 December 2005 in Innsbruck. Skaters competed in the disciplines of men's singles, ladies' singles, and ice dancing. The results were used to choose the Austrian teams to the 2006 Winter Olympics, the 2006 World Championships, and the 2006 European Championships.

Senior results

Men

Ladies

Ice dancing

External links
 results

Austrian Figure Skating Championships
2005 in figure skating
Austrian Figure Skating Championships, 2006
Figure skating